Jacques Boyon (30 September 1934 – 15 January 2019) was a French politician.

Early life 
Jacques Boyon was the son of Marc Boyon, a normalist and aggregator of grammar, and a teacher of letters, history and geography, and brother of Michel Boyon.

Jacques Boyon was a member of the Honorary Committee of the Initiative and Freedom Movement. A former pupil of the ENA, he was appointed in 1960 Auditor at the Court of Auditors.

Political career
He was promoted to a councilor in 1986. He was deputy in the National Assembly for Ain, mayor of Pont-d'Ain, president of the General Council of Ain and secretary of state for defense under the government of cohabitation of Jacques Chirac from 1986 to 1988. He was president of the Lake Geneva Council from 1989 to 1991. He was then Chairman of the Board of the Institute of International and Strategic Relations between 2005 and 2012.

References

1934 births
2019 deaths
Rally for the Republic politicians
Politicians from Nantes
Deputies of the 6th National Assembly of the French Fifth Republic
Deputies of the 8th National Assembly of the French Fifth Republic
Deputies of the 9th National Assembly of the French Fifth Republic
Deputies of the 10th National Assembly of the French Fifth Republic
Sciences Po alumni
École nationale d'administration alumni